is a town located in Fukushima Prefecture, Japan. , the town has an estimated population of 4,117 in 1749 households, of which 45.88% were classified as "elderly households" The town had  a population density of 5.5 persons per km2. Tadami is famous locally for its own Snow Festival, where huge sculptures and replicas of monuments are cut out of Tadami's abundant snow.

Geography
Tadami is located in the mountainous western portion of the Aizu region of Fukushima Prefecture, bordered Niigata Prefecture to the west.

Mountains
 Aizuasahidake
 Asakusadake
 Gamoudake

Rivers
 Tadami River
 Ina River

Lakes
 Lake Tadami
 Lake Tagokura

Neighboring municipalities
Fukushima Prefecture
 Kaneyama
 Shōwa
 Minamiaizu
 Hinoemata
Niigata Prefecture
 Uonuma
 Sanjō
 Aga

Climate
Tadami has a humid continental climate (Köppen Dfa) characterized by warm summers and cold winters with heavy snowfall.  The average annual temperature in Tadami is 11.1 °C. The average annual rainfall is 1749 mm with September as the wettest month. The temperatures are highest on average in August, at around 24.4 °C, and lowest in January, at around -1.3 °C.

Demographics
Per Japanese census data, the population of Tadami peaked around the year 1960 and has declined steadily in the decades since. It is now much smaller than it was a century ago.

History
The area of present-day Tadami was part of ancient Mutsu Province and formed part of the holdings of Aizu Domain during the Edo period. After the Meiji Restoration, it was organized as part of Minamiaizu District in Fukushima Prefecture. Inahoku village was founded on April 1, 1889 with the establishment of the modern municipalities system. It changed its name on November 3, 1953 to Tadami. The village expanded on July 20, 1955 through a merger with neighboring Meiwa Village. Tadami was raised to town status on August 1, 1959 after merging with the village of Asahi.

Economy

Hydroelectric power generation from numerous dams on the Tadami River is the primary source of revenue for the town.

Education
The town has three public elementary schools and one public junior high school operated by the town government. The town has one public high school operated by the Fukushima Prefectural Board of Education.

Elementary schools
 Tadami Elementary School
 Asahi Elementary School
 Meiwa Elementary School

Junior high schools
 Tadami Junior High School

High schools
 Tadami High School

Transportation

Railway
 JR East – Tadami Line
 -  -

Highway

Local attractions
 Tadami Hot Springs
 Fukasawa Hot Springs
 Mizukubo castle ruin
 Tagokura Dam
 Kurotani Shrine
 Tadami Museum
 Kawai Tsuginosuke Museum
 Beech tree forest, listed on UNESCO Biosphere Reserves in 2014

References

External links

Official Website 

 
Towns in Fukushima Prefecture